Sinotroglodytes bedosae is a species of beetle in the family Carabidae, the only species in the genus Sinotroglodytes.

References

Trechinae